Luray Downtown Historic District is a national historic district located at Luray, Page County, Virginia. The district includes 75 contributing buildings, 1 contributing structure, and 3 contributing objects in the central business district of the town of Luray.  They include residential, commercial, governmental, and institutional buildings in a variety of popular 19th and 20th century architectural styles.  Notable buildings include the Skyline Building (c. 1925, c. 1950), Luray Motor Company (1935), Luray United Methodist Church (1899-1900), Luray Post Office (1938), Page County Record Building (1912), Bridge Theatre (Dove1 Building), Casey Jones Overall Factory (1922), Mansion Inn, Jordan-McKim Building, Hotel Laurance, and Mimslyn Inn (1930-1931). The contributing objects include the Confederate Monument (1918) and clock. Located in the district are the separately listed Luray Norfolk and Western Passenger Station and Page County Courthouse.

It was listed on the National Register of Historic Places in 2003.

References

Historic districts on the National Register of Historic Places in Virginia
Buildings and structures in Page County, Virginia
National Register of Historic Places in Page County, Virginia